Greg Hough is a Christian musician and, with Bob Hartman, one of the founding members in 1972 of the Christian rock band, Petra. During the 1970s, he and Hartman were the band's main songwriters and lead singers.

Career 
Hough left the band in 1979. He continued to play Christian music with the bands Ransom and Ju'so. He also worked with the alternative-country trio Andrews, Hough, and Dan.

In 2003, Hough returned to rock music when he joined the former Petra founding member and drummer, Bill Glover in a project called GHD. After releasing one album, another former Petra founding member, John DeGroff, joined the project and the band changed its name to GHF (God Has Forgiven).

In 2004, Hough and DeGroff rejoined Hartman on stage in a reunion of the original Petra line-up held in Angola, Indiana.

Outside music, Hough has been a practitioner of chiropractic in Fort Wayne, Indiana, since May 1989.

References

Year of birth missing (living people)
Living people
American performers of Christian music
Petra (band) members
Musicians from Fort Wayne, Indiana